Paul Carrington may refer to:

Paul Carrington (judge) (1733–1818), 18th century US political official and jurist from Virginia
Paul Carrington (American football) (born 1982), American football player